Samir El Moussaoui (born 17 September 1986) is a Dutch footballer of Moroccan descent, who currently plays as a centre back for Wateringse Veld in the Dutch Tweede Klasse. He formerly played for ADO Den Haag, FC Den Bosch and Excelsior. Mostly notably, he had a ten-year stint with SVV Scheveningen, making more than 200 appearances for the club between 2010 and 2020.

Career
On February 16, 2007 he played his first Eredivisie match for ADO against Willem II Tilburg. 

In December 2008 he was one of four players released by ADO Den Haag, alongside Tim De Meersman, Robin Faber and Virgilio Teixeira.

Since then, he has played shortly for Den Bosch and Excelsior, but was released from both clubs after a short period of time. In the summer of 2010 he started playing for SVV Scheveningen, currently in the Dutch Topklasse.

References

External links
clubachterdeduinen.nl

1986 births
Living people
Dutch footballers
ADO Den Haag players
Excelsior Rotterdam players
Eredivisie players
Eerste Divisie players
Tweede Divisie players
Derde Divisie players
Dutch sportspeople of Moroccan descent
Footballers from The Hague
Association football defenders
SVV Scheveningen players